Antonio Juanico Torres (13 May 1905 – 3 August 1992) was a Spanish tennis player. He competed in the Davis Cup from 1926 to 1932.

His older brothers Claudio (1889–1921) and Víctor (1900–1962) were footballers, and both played for RCD Español, among other teams.

References

1905 births
1992 deaths
Spanish male tennis players
Tennis players from Barcelona
20th-century Spanish people